Cytochrome d, previously known as cytochrome a2, is a name for all cytochromes (electron-transporting heme proteins) that contain heme D as a cofactor. Two unrelated classes of cytochrome d are known: Cytochrome bd, an enzyme that generates a charge across the membrane so that protons will move, and cytochrome cd1 (NirS; SCOP ), a nitrite reductase.

Cytochrome bd is found in plenty of aerobic bacteria, especially when it has grown with a limited oxygen supply. Compared to other terminal oxidases, it is notable for its high oxygen affinity and resistance to cyanide poisoning. It has a group of very similar relatives that do not use heme D, known as cyanide insensitive oxidases (CIOs).

Function 

Cytochrome d is, as other proteins of its family, a membrane-bound hemeprotein, but unlike cytochromes a and b, cytochrome D has a heme D instead of a heme A or heme B group.

Cytochrome d is part of the cytochrome bd terminal oxidase which catalyse the two electron oxidation of ubiquinol. This process is an oxidative phosphorylation that oxidizes the ubiquinol-8 to ubiquinone. The chemical reaction followed by this process is:

Ubiquinol-8 + O2 → Ubiquinone-8 + H2O 

By a similar reaction, it also catalyses the reduction of oxygen to water, which involves 4 electrons.

As a terminal oxidase, the reaction generates a proton motive force:

2 ubiquinol[inner membrane] + O2 + 4 H+[cytoplasm] → 2 ubiquinone[inner membrane] + 2 H2O + 4 H+[periplasm]

Some members of the family may accept or prefer other electron-transporting quinols such as menaquinol or plastoquinol in lieu of ubiquinol.

Structure 
Cytochrome bd (OPM family 805) is a tri-heme oxidase as it is compound by cytochromes b558, b595 and d. Its main function is the reduction of O2 to H2O. It is thought that it uses a di-heme active site, which is formed by the hemes of cytochromes b595 and d. These two cytochromes are considered high-spin complexes, what is directly related to the electrons' spin. While other respiratory terminal oxidases which catalyze that same reaction have a heme-copper active site and use a proton pump, cytochrome bd has an active site with iron instead of copper and need no proton pump as they can produce a proton-motion force themselves. They are embedded in the bacterial cytoplasmic bilayer and serve as terminal oxidases in the respiratory chain.

The oxidases tend to have two or three subunits. Subunits 1 and 2 are predicted to have pseudo-symmetry, and are sufficient to bind the two heme b molecules. Some proteobacterial assemblies require a third subunit to bind heme d; others do not.

The high-resolution structure heterotrimeric Cytochromes bd from Geobacillus species has been determined. The third subunit does not share sequence homology with the third subunit proteobacteria, but does come into the assemblies at a similar position.

Occurrence

Escherichia coli 
E. coli possess two sets of Cytochrome bd. The bd-I complex (CydABX) is a heterotrimer, while the bd-II complex (AppCB) is a heterodimer. There is an AppX gene that may correspond to a subunit 3 for AppCB.

The ability of bd-II to generate a proton motive force is a matter of recent debate, putting it under the nonelectrogenic Ubiquinol oxidase (H+-transporting) in some categorizations.

Azotobacter vinelandii 
Azotobacter vinelandii is a nitrogen-fixing bacteria which is known by its high respiratory rate among aerobic organisms. Some physiological studies postulate that cytochrome d functions as a terminal oxidase in the membranes of this organism, taking part in the electron transport system. The studies characterized the different genes in the two subunits (third subunit ). A very extensive homology with CydAB of the E. coli was found in these studies.

Spectra 

Generally, in protein complexes, cytochrome D gives an absorption band of approximately 636 nm or 638 nm, depending on the cytochrome d form. If it is oxidized, the band has a length of 636 nm, and a 638 nm length if it is reduced. It is commonly associated to certain prosthetic groups when found in multiple subunit complexes. Detecting cytochrome d as Fe(II) pyridine alkaline hemachrome is very difficult because the stability under these conditions is limited. If cytochrome d is pulled out of the protein complex (as heme D) and placed in ether containing from 1 to 5 % of HCl, it gives a different absorption band (603 nm, in the oxidized form).

References